Joël Dicker (born 16 June 1985) is a Swiss novelist.

Early life
Dicker attended Geneva schools. At the age of 19, he enrolled at the Cours Florent in Paris. After one year, he returned to Switzerland to attend law school, where he received his Masters of Law from the University of Geneva in 2010.

Career
In 2010, Dicker won the Prix des écrivains genevois (Geneva Writers’ Prize), a prize for unpublished manuscripts. Subsequently, Parisian editor Bernard de Fallois acquired Dicker's winning submission, Les derniers jours de nos pères (The Final Days of Our Fathers), and published it in early 2012. The book tells the story of the Special Operations Executive, a British organisation during world War II.

In September 2012, de Fallois published Dicker's La Vérité sur l’Affaire Harry Quebert (The Truth About the Harry Quebert Affair), the story of an American novelist with writer's block who begins to investigate a murder of which his former university professor is accused. The book was coolly received in North America  but had more success in Europe. At the 2012 Frankfurt Book Fair, many foreign editors acquired the rights from Bernard de Fallois. The book was translated into 32 languages. In late October 2012, La Vérité… (The Truth…) won the 2012 Grand Prix du Roman de l’Académie française. It was also shortlisted for the Prix Goncourt and the Prix Femina.

In November 2012, La Vérité… was awarded the prix Goncourt des lycéens. For this prize, 2000 French-speaking high-school students vote on their favorite novel from the year's Prix Goncourt shortlist. In summer 2013, La Vérité… displaced Dan Brown’s Inferno from the top of bestseller lists all over Europe. Early readers of the English translation described the book as "literary and clever." Considered Switzerland's answer to The Girl with the Dragon Tattoo and compared to the fiction of Nabokov and Roth as well as the television series Twin Peaks, The Truth About the Harry Quebert Affair was published in the United States by Penguin on 27 May 2014. It was one of the biggest original acquisitions in the history of Penguin Books. It has also subsequently been made into a 10-part television miniseries.

Dicker's third novel, Le Livre des Baltimore, was released on 26 September 2015.

Dicker's fourth novel, La disparition de Stephanie Mailer, was released in March 2018.

In March 2021, he announced via a video on Twitter that he was leaving the Fallois publishing house on January 1, 2022, to create his own publishing house. The small Fallois publishing house ceased its activity following this departure, in accordance with the wishes of its founder, who had died three years earlier. In October 2021, he launched Éditions Rosie & Wolfe, named after a woman, Rosina, who introduced him to the pleasure of reading and after his grandfather, who gave him a taste for writing.

Bibliography

Novels
 Les derniers jours de nos pères [The Final Days of our Fathers] (2010) 
 The Truth About the Harry Quebert Affair (2012) translated by Sam Taylor
 The Baltimore Boys (2015) translated by Alison Anderson
 The Disappearance of Stephanie Mailer (2018) translated by Howard Curtis
 The Enigma of Room 622 (2020) translated by Robert Bonnono
 The Alaska Sanders Affair (2022)

Short stories
 Le Tigre [The Tiger] (2005)

Notes and references

External links 
 

Writers from Geneva
1985 births
Living people
21st-century Swiss novelists
Swiss male novelists
University of Geneva alumni
Grand Prix du roman de l'Académie française winners
Prix Goncourt des lycéens winners
21st-century male writers